Bonzai Records, also known as Bonzai Music or Bonzai Progressive, is a Belgium-based record label specializing in techno, trance, hard trance, Goa trance, rave music and hardcore music.

It was formed by DJ Fly in the back of record-shop The Blitz in Belgium in 1992 as a sublabel to Lightning Records, which went bankrupt in March 2003 and was subsequently replaced by the Banshee Worx label. Since its renewal in 2003, the label has released records under "Bonzai Progressive", however the 'Bonzai Records' catalog numbering continues.

Sublabels
List of other current/former sublabels under the Bonzai name.

 Bonzai Club Grooves (2008)
 Bonzai Elemental (2006)
 Bonzai Records Digital (2006-2006)
 Bonzai Fiesta (2005)
 Bonzai Urban (2004)
 Bonzai Backcatalogue (2003–2005)
 UK Bonzai Gold Series (2001–2002), sublabel of 'UK Bonzai'
 UK Bonzai (2000), successor to 'Bonzai Records UK'
 Bonzai Trance Progressive UK (1999–2002)

 Bonzai Germany/Bonzai Trance Germany (1998–2000), run by 'Music Research' company.
 Bonzai Records UK  (1998–2000)
 Bonzai Limited (1997)
 Bonzai Classics (1996)
 Bonzai Records Italy/Bonzai Trance Progressive Italy 1996-2003
 Bonzai Jumps Italy (1996–1998), subdivision of Arsenic Sound
 Bonzai Groove (1996-1996)
 Bonzai Trance Progressive (1995)
 Bonzai Jumps (1994–1998)

List of artists
 Cherry Moon
 Rawnn 
 DJ Fly (Christian Pieters)
 Yves Deruyter
 DJ Bountyhunter (Stefan Melis)
 Jones & Stephenson (Frank Sels & Axel Stephenson)
 Dream Your Dream
 Thunderball
 Final Analyzis
 Stockhousen
 Fernie
 Airwave
 Blufeld
 Fred First
 Manu Riga
 Soundmodul
 Hypnotised
 Man On the Moon
 ignacio demaria
 Quadran
 Kostas Maskalides
 Jasper Jinx
 Aqua Contact
 Push
 Ferdas Digital
 Vechigen
 Sunshine Rockerz House
 X-Change (Stefan Melis)
 Limited Growth (Frederico Santini & Axel Stephenson)
 Mindvirus (Jens Brzoska)
 Liquid Nations

References

External links
 Official site

Belgian record labels
Record labels established in 1992
Electronic dance music record labels
Trance record labels
House music record labels